Vera Lapko was the defending champion, but chose to participate in Montreal.

Madison Brengle won the title after Kristie Ahn retired in the final at 6–4, 1–0.

Seeds

Draw

Finals

Top half

Bottom half

References
Main Draw

Koser Jewelers Tennis Challenge - Singles